Entice and similar may refer to:
 Yamaha Enticer, a 2003 motorcycle manufactured in India (also the name of a 1979 snowmobile)
 N-Tyce, a UK girl group in the late 1990s
 N-Tyce, a rapper with Deadly Venoms

See also
 Seduction